"Alive" is a song by British record production duo Chase & Status, featuring vocals from British singer Jacob Banks. It was released independently on 15 December 2013 as the third single from their third studio album Brand New Machine. However, the song charted prior to independent release and entered the UK Dance Chart at number 40 on the week ending 23 November 2013, rising to number 16 on the week ending 30 November. The release of the music video also caused a surge in popularity and the song rose to number 48 in the UK Singles Chart. It has later risen to peak at number 21 on the week ending 25 January 2014. The song also featured in a FIFA 14 trailer for Xbox One and PlayStation 4.

Music video
A music video to accompany the release of "Alive" was first released onto YouTube on 4 December 2013 at a total length of seven minutes and thirteen seconds. The video was filmed in the Blackfeet Indian Reservation, Montana, USA. It was directed by Josh Cole.

Track listing

Credits and personnel
 Vocals – Jacob Banks
 Lyrics – Jacob Banks, Toby Young
 Producer – Chase & Status (Will Kennard and Saul Milton)
 Label – MTA Records, Mercury Records, RAM Records

Chart performance

Weekly charts

Certifications

Release history

References

2013 songs
2013 singles
Chase & Status songs
Songs written by Will Kennard
Songs written by Saul Milton
Mercury Records singles
RAM Records singles
MTA Records singles
Songs written by Jacob Banks